In chemistry, NMR line broadening techniques (or NMR line broadening experiments) can be used to determine the rate constant and the Gibbs free energy of exchange reactions of two different chemical compounds. If the two species are in equilibrium and exchange to each other, peaks of both species get broadened in the spectrum. This observation of broadened peaks can be used to obtain kinetic and thermodynamic information of the exchange reaction.

Determining bond rotational energies 
A basic NMR line broadening experiment is to determine the rotational energy barrier of a certain chemical bond. If the bond rotates slowly enough compared to the NMR time scale (e.g., amide bond), two different species can be detected by the NMR spectrometer. Considering that the time scale of NMR spectroscopy is about a few seconds, this technique can be used to examine the kinetics and/or thermodynamics of chemical exchange reactions on the order of seconds.

In general, the energy barrier to rotate a bond is low enough at room temperature, which means that the rotation is fast, making the two different species indistinguishable. At low temperatures, however, it is harder for a bond to overcome the energy barrier to rotate, resulting in two separate peaks in the spectrum. With these principles, NMR spectra of a molecule with a high rotational barrier should be obtained at several different temperatures (i.e., variable temperature NMR) to distinguish two different peaks at low temperature in slow exchange and to find the temperature at which the two peaks merge.

Determining electron transfer self-exchange rates 
Electron transfer self-exchange rates can be also determined with the experimental value of line-width and chemical shift. Sharp peaks of diamagnetic compounds can be broadened during the electron transfer with its partner paramagnetic compound (one-electron oxidized species), since paramagnetic compounds exhibit broader peaks at a different chemical shift. If their self-exchange rate is sufficiently faster than the NMR timescale, the line-broadening of the peaks is observed at shifted chemical shifts in the spectrum. In order to determine the self-exchange rate of sample compounds, one can choose a certain characteristic peak of the sample diamagnetic compound, and examine the peak broadening in the mixture with its partner paramagnetic compound.

References

Nuclear magnetic resonance